Social impact may refer to:

 Social impact assessment
 Social impact theory
 Social influence

Social science disambiguation pages